Anping District is a district of Tainan, Taiwan. In March 2012, it was named one of the Top 10 Small Tourist Towns by the Tourism Bureau of Taiwan. It is home to 68,217 people.

Name
The older place name of Tayouan derives from the ethnonym of a nearby Taiwanese aboriginal tribe, and was written by the Dutch and Portuguese variously as Taiouwang, Tayowan, etc. In his translations of Dutch records, missionary William Campbell used the variant Tayouan and wrote that Taoan and Taiwan also occur. As Dutch spelling varied greatly at the time (see History of Dutch orthography), other variants may be seen.

After the Dutch were ousted  by Koxinga, Han immigrants renamed the area "Anping" after the Anping Bridge in Quanzhou, Fujian. Soon after Qing rule was established in 1683, the name "Taiwan" was officially used to refer to the whole island with the establishment of Taiwan Prefecture.

History

The history of Anping dates back to the 17th century, when the Dutch East India Company occupied a "high sandy down" called Tayouan and built Fort Zeelandia. The Dutch moved their headquarters to Tayouan after leaving the Pescadores in 1624. Due to silting, the islet has joined with mainland Taiwan.

Koxinga's army brought an end to the Dutch colonial period via the Siege of Fort Zeelandia.

In the Japanese period, the history of trade between China and Japan unfolded at Anping. According to the 1904 census, the city's population was 5,972.

Administrative divisions
The district consists of Jincheng, Yuguang, Jianping, Yiping, Huaping, Pingtong, Wenping, Guoping, Yuping, Yizai, Pingan, Tianfei and Wangcheng Village.

Government institutions
 Tainan City Government
 Tainan City Council

Tourist attractions

 Anping Old Street
 Anping Small Fort
 Anping Tree House
 Canal Museum
 Eternal Golden Castle
 Former Tait & Co. Merchant House
 Fort Zeelandia
 Haishan Hall
 Tianhou Temple
 Anping Oyster Shell Cement Kiln Museum
 Miaoshou Temple
 Yanping Street Old Well
 ROCS Te Yang museum ship

References

Citations

Bibliography

External links

  
 Download  Anping District Android APP, Tainan City
 Download Anping District ios APP, Tainan City

Districts of Tainan
Former islands